Andreas Seppi was the defending champion, but lost in the final to Andy Roddick, 6–3, 6–2.

Seeds

Draw

Finals

Top half

Bottom half

Qualifying

Seeds

Qualifiers

Draw

First qualifier

Second qualifier

Third qualifier

Fourth qualifier

References
 Main Draw
 Qualifying Draw

Aegon International - Singles
2012 Men's Singles